Lehrensteinsfeld is a municipality in the district of Heilbronn in Baden-Württemberg in Germany, with a population of 2,590 (as of 2019).

References

External links
 

Heilbronn (district)
Towns in Baden-Württemberg